The  Government of Maharashtra is the state governing authority for the state of Maharashtra, India. It is a democratically elected government with 288 MLAs elected to the Vidhan Sabha for a five-year term.

Maharashtra has a Maharashtra Legislature which consists of two Houses, the Vidhan Sabha (Legislative Assembly) and the Vidhan Parishad (Legislative Council). As is the case in a parliamentary system, the government is formed by the party, alliance or group of assembly members who command the majority in the Lower House. The Lower House majority leader becomes the Chief Minister and selects the cabinet members from both Houses. In case an unelected person becomes the Chief Minister, they must be elected to either House within the following six months.

Head Leaders

Council of Ministers

On 30 June 2022 Eknath Shinde was sworn in as the Chief Minister of Maharashtra on 30 June 2022,  on resignation of his predecessor Uddhav Thackeray. Shinde leads a government consisting of his Shiv Sena (Shinde group) party and Bharatiya Janata Party

Cabinet Ministers

By Departments
An alphabetical list of all the departments of Maharashtra Government with terms :
Cabinet Ministers

Guardian Ministers

Secretaries Government of Maharashtra

See All Ministry 
Chief Minister's Office (Maharashtra)
Deputy Chief Minister's Office (Maharashtra)
Ministry of General Administration (Maharashtra)
Ministry of Information and Public Relations (Maharashtra)
Ministry of Information Technology (Maharashtra)
Ministry of Law and Judiciary (Maharashtra)
Ministry of Home Affairs (Maharashtra)
Ministry of State Border Defence (Maharashtra) 
Ministry of Public Works (Excluding Public Undertakings) (Maharashtra)
Ministry of Public Works (Including Public Undertakings) (Maharashtra)
Ministry of Finance (Maharashtra)
Ministry of Planning (Maharashtra)
Ministry of Revenue (Maharashtra)
Ministry of State Excise (Maharashtra)
Ministry of Special Assistance (Maharashtra)
Ministry of Social Justice (Maharashtra)
Ministry of Forests Department (Maharashtra)
Ministry of Environment and Climate Change (Maharashtra)
Ministry of Energy (Maharashtra)
Ministry of Water Resources (Maharashtra)
Ministry of Command Area Development (Maharashtra)
Ministry of Public Health (Maharashtra)
Ministry of Housing (Maharashtra)
Ministry of Urban Development (Maharashtra)
Ministry of Rural Development (Maharashtra)
Ministry of Labour (Maharashtra)
Ministry of Co-operation (Maharashtra)
Ministry of Marketing (Maharashtra)
Ministry of Transport (Maharashtra)
Ministry of Industries (Maharashtra)
Ministry of Mining Department (Maharashtra)
Ministry of Textiles (Maharashtra)
Ministry of Protocol (Maharashtra)
Ministry of Tourism (Maharashtra)
Ministry of Cultural Affairs (Maharashtra)
Ministry of Marathi Language (Maharashtra)
Ministry of Water Supply (Maharashtra)
Ministry of Soil and Water Conservation (Maharashtra)
Ministry of Parliamentary Affairs (Maharashtra)
Ministry of Sanitation (Maharashtra)
Ministry of Woman and Child Development (Maharashtra)
Ministry of School Education (Maharashtra)
Ministry of Medical Education (Maharashtra)
Ministry of Higher and Technical Education (Maharashtra)
Ministry of Skill Development and Entrepreneurship (Maharashtra)
Ministry of Sports and Youth Welfare (Maharashtra)
Ministry of Ex. Servicemen Welfare (Maharashtra)
Ministry of Agriculture (Maharashtra)
Ministry of Food, Civil Supplies and Consumer Protection (Maharashtra)
Ministry of Food and Drug Administration (Maharashtra)
Ministry of Animal Husbandry Department (Maharashtra)
Ministry of Dairy Development (Maharashtra)
Ministry of Horticulture (Maharashtra)
Ministry of Fisheries Department (Maharashtra)
Ministry of Ports Development (Maharashtra)
Ministry of Disaster Management (Maharashtra)
Ministry of Relief & Rehabilitation (Maharashtra)
Ministry of Khar Land Development (Maharashtra)
Ministry of Earthquake Rehabilitation (Maharashtra)
Ministry of Employment Guarantee (Maharashtra)
Ministry of Minority Development and Aukaf (Maharashtra)
Ministry of Majority Welfare Development (Maharashtra)
Ministry of Tribal Development (Maharashtra)
Ministry of Vimukta Jati (Maharashtra)
Ministry of Nomadic Tribes (Maharashtra)
Ministry of Other Backward Classes (Maharashtra)
Ministry of Other Backward Bahujan Welfare (Maharashtra)
Ministry of Special Backward Classes Welfare (Maharashtra)
Ministry of Socially and Educationally Backward Classes (Maharashtra)
Ministry of Disability Welfare (Maharashtra)
Maratha Reservation Subcommittee Government of Maharashtra

See also 
 Manav Vikas Mission
 Make in Maharashtra
 Maharashtra Vidhan Sabha
 Local government in Maharashtra
 for Maharashtra government employees

Notes

References

External links 
 Official website of cid Government of India
 Official website of Government of Maharashtra
 for Maharashtra government employees
 Bucket of latest images on Maharashtra Government. Formation.